Cosmosoma bogotensis is a moth of the family Erebidae. It was described by Cajetan Felder in 1874. It is found in Colombia.

References

bogotensis
Moths described in 1874